The 9th Canadian Comedy Awards, presented by the Canadian Comedy Foundation for Excellence (CCFE), honoured the best live, television, film, and Internet comedy of 2007.  The ceremony was held on 5 October 2008 in Regina, Saskatchewan. The ceremony was hosted by Alan Park.

Canadian Comedy Awards, also known as Beavers, were awarded in 24 categories. This included the first public-voting categories and the first awards recognizing Internet content.  The awards ceremony concluded the five-day Canadian Comedy Awards Festival which showcased performances by over 100 comic artists.  A Best of the Fest special was broadcast by The Comedy Network.

For a third consecutive year TV series Corner Gas led the nominations with nine, followed by the film Dark Rising with six.  However, neither of these works won a Beaver.  Seth Rogen and Michael Cera led the nominations amongst people with three. This Hour Has 22 Minutes won three Beavers followed by a number of artists and projects that received two, including Gavin Crawford, Gerry Dee, Geri Hall, Seth Rogen, and the films Juno and Superbad.

Festival and ceremony

The 9th Canadian Comedy Awards and Festival ran from 1 to 5 October 2008 in Regina, Saskatchewan. The province and city had provided $200,000 in funding to relocate the festival from London, Ontario. Fourteen shows were held in Regina, showcasing the talents of more than 100 comedic performers. The awards were also sponsored by The Comedy Network which compiled and broadcast the Best of the Fest television special, hosted by Gerry Dee.  The awards ceremony was hosted by Alan Park at Casino Regina.

Winners and nominees
The Awards were expanded from 20 to 24 categories this year, including three public-voting categories: best radio program or clip, best web clip, and Canadian Comedy Person of the Year.  Winners of public-voting categories were chosen by Canadian residents through an online poll.

The film Juno had been controversially excluded from Canada's industry-driven Genie Awards.  Although it had a Canadian director, lead actors, crew, and had been filmed in Canada, U.S. financing disqualified it from competition.  The Canadian Comedy Awards, however, were artist-driven with a mandate "To recognize and celebrate Canadian achievements in comedy at home and abroad" and awarded the film two Beavers.

Winners are listed first and highlighted in boldface:

Multimedia

Live

Television

Film

Internet

Special Awards

Most wins

The following people, shows, films, etc. received multiple awards

Most nominations

The following people, shows, films, etc. received multiple nominations

Footnotes

References

External links
Canadian Comedy Awards official website

Canadian Comedy Awards
Canadian Comedy Awards
Culture of Regina, Saskatchewan
Awards
Awards